Miquel de Palol i Muntanyola (born April 2, 1953) is a Catalan architect, poet and storyteller, son of the archaeologist Pere de Palol.

In 2011 he was appointed president of the Association of Collegiate Writers of Catalonia. His first novel in Catalan, El jardí dels set crepuscles, deserved in the year of its publication (1989) almost all the prizes available for works in Catalan language.

Biography 
Born in Barcelona, he lived in Valladolid until he was 17, due to his father's job. Back in Barcelona, he studied Architecture and began his literary activity as a poet. In 1982 he won the Carles Riba poetry award with El porxo de les mirades. For this same work he received, in 1984, the Critica Serra d'Or award.

His first novel published in Catalan, El jardí dels set crepuscles, deserved in the year of its publication (1989) almost all the prizes awarded in the Catalan language (Joan Crexells, Crítica Serra d'Or, National of the Criticism and National Literature of the Generalitat of Catalonia, as well as the Critical Eye Award). In 1994 he obtained the Ciutat de Barcelona award in the Catalan language for Igur Neblí. In 1997 he won the Josep Pla award for the play El legislador and the Víctor Català award for Tales for old teenagers. In 1998 he won the Sant Jordi award for Novel with El quincorn.

His narrative production moves between the fantastic and legendary story and philosophical speculation. It has been translated into Spanish, German, Dutch and Italian. Palol has also written widely on the subject of Catalan culture in the age of globalization.

References

External links 
 Palol's profile in English at Catalan writers Association website

Writers from Catalonia
People from Barcelona
Living people
1953 births